The Ummah was a music production collective, composed of members Q-Tip and Ali Shaheed Muhammad of A Tribe Called Quest, and the late Jay Dee (also known as J Dilla) of the Detroit-based group Slum Village. Occasional members included Raphael Saadiq, and D'Angelo. In addition to producing nearly the entirety of A Tribe Called Quest's fourth and fifth albums, the Ummah provided backing tracks and remixes for a notable array of hip hop and contemporary R&B artists, including Busta Rhymes, Whitney Houston, Keith Murray, the Brand New Heavies, Michael Jackson, Janet Jackson, and Jon B. The group was so named because two of its members (Tip and Ali) are devout Muslims. The word "ummah" is Arabic for "community", "nation", or "brotherhood". Generally, the term refers to the global Muslim population.

Biography

Background  
The collective took shape around 1995; veteran keyboardist Amp Fiddler introduced Jay Dee (who at the time was shopping for a deal for his group) to Q-Tip during the 1994 Lollapalooza. Tip was impressed enough by Jay Dee's soulful productions to invite him as an addition to Tribe's music-production team, which until then consisted of Tip and occasionally Ali Shaheed.

Production work
According to Q-Tip, productions credited to the Ummah were made individually by its members. Thus, the contributing member was given a songwriting credit for their work.

Its first work, Beats, Rhymes and Life, was criticized for moving away from the group's earlier, denser, and bottom heavy sound exemplified by tracks such as "Scenario" and "Oh My God." The new sound, which now leaned towards a more laid-back and polished tone, would be embraced a little more with the release of Tribe's "Find a Way" from its fifth album, The Love Movement, although the album itself received a lukewarm reception, and no second proper single or video was released.

Following this and the split of A Tribe Called Quest, Q-Tip and Jay Dee continued to collaborate under the Ummah moniker, producing all of Tip's solo album Amplified, with the exception of two tracks from DJ Scratch. For several reasons, including label complications, Tip's solo career became largely inactive while Jay Dee and D'Angelo went on to form the Soulquarians with other like-minded artists. Although A Tribe Called Quest briefly reunited to release "ICU (Doin' It)" in 2003, the Ummah did not collaborate again after that, and Jay Dee's death on February 10, 2006 from complications of Lupus ended the project definitively.

Despite the well-known projects and collaborations the collective did, people would erroneously assume that The Ummah was another name, or perhaps even an alter-ego of Q-Tip. As a result, many contributions by J Dilla would go overlooked and unnoticed. Looking back at the collective's formation and  history, in an interview, Q-Tip stated:

Discography

Albums 
A Tribe Called Quest, Beats, Rhymes and Life (Jive, 1996) – RIAA certification: Platinum
A Tribe Called Quest, The Love Movement (Jive, 1998) – RIAA certification: Gold
Q-Tip, Amplified (Arista, 1999) – RIAA certification: Gold

Selected production

1996 
Da Bush Babees - "Gravity", "3 MCs"
Gravity
Grant Green - "Down Here on the Ground (The Ummah Remix)"
Various artists - The New Groove: The Blue Note Remix Project
Keith Murray - "Dangerous Ground", "The Rhyme (Remix)"
Enigma
Busta Rhymes - "Ill Vibe", "Still Shining", "Keep It Movin'"
The Coming
Busta Rhymes - "Woo Hah!! Got You All in Check (The Jay-Dee Bounce Remix)", "Woo Hah!! Got You All in Check" (The Jay-Dee Other Shit)"
12"/CD single
Busta Rhymes - "It's a Party (The Ummah Remix)", "Ill Vibe (The Ummah Remix)"
12"/CD single

1997
A Tribe Called Quest - "Same Ol' Thing"
Various artists - Men in Black: The Album
Janet Jackson - "Got 'Til It's Gone (Ummah's Uptown Saturday Night Mix)", "Got 'Til It's Gone (Ummah Jay Dee's Revenge Mix)"
12"/CD single
Michael Jackson - "HIStory (The Ummah Radio Mix)", "HIStory (The Ummah Urban Mix)", "History (The Ummah DJ Mix)"
12"/CD single
Mint Condition - "Let Me Be the One (Ummah Remix Featuring Phife)", "Let Me Be the One (Ummah Remix Featuring Q-Tip)"
12"/CD single
Busta Rhymes - "So Hardcore"
When Disaster Strikes...
Brand New Heavies - "Sometimes (The Ummah Remix)"
12"/CD single
Jon B. - "Cool Relax"
Cool Relax
Towa Tei - "Happy (Q-Tip Remix Dub)"
12"/CD single

1998
Jamiroquai - "Deeper Underground (The Ummah Mix)"
12"/CD single

1999
Raphael Saadiq & Q-Tip - "Get Involved"
The PJs: Music from & Inspired by the Hit Television Series
Heavy D - "Listen"
Heavy

2000
Whitney Houston - "Fine"
Whitney: The Greatest Hits

References

J Dilla
American hip hop record producers
African-American record producers
Record production trios
American musical trios
East Coast hip hop groups
Midwest hip hop groups
African-American musical groups
Musical groups established in 1996
American songwriting teams
Musical collectives